Dushara, (Nabataean Arabic: 𐢅𐢈𐢝𐢛𐢀‎ dwšrʾ) also transliterated as Dusares, is a pre-Islamic Arabian god worshipped by the Nabataeans at Petra and Madain Saleh (of which city he was the patron). Safaitic inscriptions imply he was the son of Al-Lat, and that he assembled in the heavens with other gods. He is called "Dushara from Petra" in one inscription. Dushara was expected to bring justice if called by the correct ritual.

Etymology 
Dushara is known first from epigraphic Nabataean sources who invariably spell the name dwsrʾ, the Nabataean script denoting only consonants. He appears in Classical Greek sources Δουσάρης (Dousárēs) and in Latin as Dusares. The original meaning is disputed, but early Muslim historian Ibn al-Kalbi in his "Book of Idols" explains the name as Dhū l-Šarā, meaning likely "The One from Shara", Shara being a mountain range south-east of the Dead Sea. If this interpretation is correct, Dushara would be more of a title than a proper name, but both the exact form of the name and its interpretation are disputed.

Worship 

In Greek times, he was associated with Zeus because he was the chief of the Nabataean pantheon as well as with Dionysus.

A shrine to Dushara has been discovered in the harbour of ancient Puteoli in Italy. The city was an important nexus for trade to the Near East, and it is known to have had a Nabataean presence during the mid 1st century BCE. The cult continued in some capacity well into the Roman period and possibly as late as the Islamic period.

This deity was mentioned by the 9th century CE Muslim historian Hisham Ibn Al-Kalbi, who wrote in The Book of Idols (Kitab al-Asnām) that: "The Banū al-Hārith ibn-Yashkur ibn-Mubashshir of the ʻAzd had an idol called Dū Sharā."

Safaitic inscriptions mention animal sacrifices to Dushara, asking for a variety of services.

See also
 Book of Idols
 Khaabou
 Shara

References

Bibliography
 Ibn al-Kalbī, The Book of Idols, Being a Translation from the Arabic of the Kitāb al-Asnām. Tr. and comm. Nabih Amin Faris (Princeton, Princeton University Press, 1952).
 Healey, John F., The Religion of the Nabataeans: A Conspectus (Leiden, Brill, 2001) (Religions in the Graeco-Roman World, 136).
 el-Khouri, Lamia; Johnson, David, "A New Nabataean Inscription from Wadi Mataha, Petra," Palestine Exploration Quarterly, 137,2 (2005), 169–174.

External links

Nabataean religion
Kitab al-Asnam in the original Arabic (description on p. 5)
"Solving the Enigma of Petra and the Nabataeans" Biblical Archaeology Review

Nabataea
Arabian gods
Al-Lat